ESPA College is part of Education & Services for People with Autism in Ashbrooke, Sunderland, Tyne and Wear, England. The college provides various services for people on the autistic spectrum. The college management team is located in the same buildings as the students. It educates young people aged 16–25. It was recognised in a 2010 OFSTED report as having good overall effectiveness.

The College
Opened in 1992, the college has provided a unique educational experience for learners. All learners follow a tailor-made curriculum, which is a programme of study and support specifically designed to meet the social, educational and emotional needs of the young adults that study there. Every learner has an Individual Learning Plan specific to their needs, which includes targets drawn from Education, Health & Care Plans.

ESPA aims to provide people with autism spectrum disorders (ASD) and other related disorders with an inclusive education. One aspect of this is protecting students with ASD from neurotypical students who may engage in bullying and other forms of abuse, in mainstream environments.

The College is currently managed by a team of four people: Lesley Lane is the Chief Executive, Patrick Cahill is the Principal and Mike Smith is the Admissions, Placements & Transitions Manager. 
Each site has its own management structure which includes college co-ordinators.

One College, Multiple Sites
ESPA College is split into five sites, named Ashleigh (a Hall of Residence), North Rye, South Hill, Tithebarn and Tasker. North Rye is located in Kenton, Newcastle upon Tyne. Ashleigh is located in Gosforth, Newcastle. Tithebarn is located in Stockton on Tees, next to North Tees Hospital.

Education and Services for People with Autism
As of 1 October 2008, ESPA College has slightly changed its name to reflect the practices of the colleges. It is now known as Education and Services for People with Autism rather than European Services for People with Autism.

References

External links
 

Autism-related organisations in the United Kingdom
Schools for people on the autistic spectrum
Education in the City of Sunderland
Educational institutions established in 1992
1992 establishments in England
Organisations based in Tyne and Wear